Project Hope is a 1961 American short documentary film produced by Frank P. Bibas, documenting the maiden voyage of the SS Hope. At the 34th Academy Awards, held in 1962, it won an Oscar for Documentary Short Subject. The Academy Film Archive preserved Project Hope in 2006.

References

External links

1961 films
1961 independent films
1960s short documentary films
American short documentary films
American independent films
Best Documentary Short Subject Academy Award winners
1960s English-language films
1960s American films